Wandering Stars (Yiddish: Blonzhende Stern or Blundzhende Shtern) is a novel by Sholem Aleichem, serialized in Warsaw newspapers from 1909 to 1911. In it, Leibel, the son of a wealthy shtetl family, falls in love with cantor's daughter Reizel, and both fall for a traveling Yiddish theatre group. Separating and becoming successful performers in the West, under the names of Leo Rafalesco and Rosa Spivak, they eventually find each other again in America.

Two English translations of the novel exist: a 1952 abridged version by Frances Butwin (Wandering Star), and a 2009 unabridged version by Aliza Shevrin (with a foreword by Tony Kushner). 

Yiddishpiel, a Yiddish theatre in Israel, adapted a musical-stage production based on the novel, with book by Aya Kaplan and Joshua Sobol and direction by Aya Kaplan. The production opened in January 2016 and closed by March 2016.

References

External links
Online Yiddish Book: Wandering Stars

1911 novels
Novels by Sholem Aleichem
Novels first published in serial form
Works originally published in Polish newspapers
20th-century Russian novels
Picaresque novels